Malliotaki is a Greek surname. Notable people with the surname include:
Nicole Malliotakis (born 1980), American politician and U.S. Representative
Popi Malliotaki (born 1971), Greek pop-folk singer
, Greek journalist and daughter of Popi Maliotaki